Dr. Sharmila is a doctor, actress, social activist and YouTuber from Tamil Nadu, India. She debuted in a STAR Vijay show, Puthira Punithama? along with N. Mathrubootham, which made her popular. She went on to act in various television series in both Tamil and Malayalam, and a couple of Tamil films.

Early life 
Sharmila was born on 15 November 1974 into a Brahmin family. Her father Kothandaraman owned a pharmaceutical concern. 

Sharmila's younger brother Hari died sometime before 2022.

Education 
Sharmila attended C.S.I. Ewart Matriculation Higher Secondary School in Chennai, and was a topper there. She also learnt Bharatanatyam for ten years under Nandana Gopalakrishnan.

Medical career 
Sharmila went on pursue an MBBS degree in Orthopedics at Kilpauk Medical College (Chennai) in 1993. Later, she worked as a house surgeon at Government Royapettah Hospital around 1996.

Television career
Sharmila started anchoring quiz shows on Jaya TV (formerly JJ TV), following which she conducted a talk show Indha Vaaram Ivar, in which she interviewed celebrities. She was subsequently selected by reputed psychiatrist Dr. N. Mathrubootham, who wanted to conduct sex education discussions on television, to read the letters from the public. The show, Puthira Punithama? brought Sharmila, who was dubbed "gutsy" for hosting the show, to popularity. Director K. Balachander took notice of her and offered her roles in his tele-serials such as Jannal and Irandaam Chanaakiyan. Sharmila considers Balachander as her mentor and guru who taught her the nuances of acting.

Shows
 Hero Heroine (Sun TV)
 Candit Camera (Sun TV)
 Puthira Punithama?(Vijay TV)
 Quiz program (JJ TV)
 Indha Varam Ivar (Vijay TV)
 Kitchen Super Star - Doubles (Vijay TV)
 Puthandu Saval (Sun TV)
 Roja Rojadan (Sun TV)
 Maathi Yosi (Sun TV)
 Kalviya? Selvama? Veerama? (Sun TV)

Filmography
All films are in Tamil, unless otherwise noted.

YouTube career 
On 24 February 2022, Sharmila announced her YouTube channel named "Sharmila Talkies". The channel's content includes politics, society, art, literature, food, life, health, soap opera, and cinema.

Awards
 Won, Asianet Television award 2015 for Best Character Actress (special Jury) for Karuthamuthu
 Nomination, Vijay Television Awards for Best Negative role 2017 for Pagal Nilavu

Personal life
Sharmila married AL Mohan, a TV production executive, but later they filed and were granted a divorce. Later, she married S. S. Balaji, a member of the Viduthalai Chiruthaigal Katchi (VCK).

Her daughter Rithvika was born on 28 December 2004.

References

External links
 Sharmila Talkies
 

1974 births
Living people
Actresses in Tamil cinema
Actresses in Tamil television
Actresses in Malayalam cinema
Actresses in Malayalam television
Actresses in Telugu cinema
Indian film actresses
21st-century Indian actresses
Indian television actresses
Indian YouTubers